Electoral district of Elizabeth may refer to:

 Electoral district of Elizabeth (New South Wales), a former electorate of the New South Wales Legislative Assembly
 Electoral district of Elizabeth (South Australia), an electorate of the South Australian House of Assembly 1970–2006 and 2018–